Anupama Deshapande is a Bollywood playback singer who has won the Filmfare Award for Best Female Playback Singer for her folk song "Sohni Chinab De" in the film Sohni Mahiwal (1984).

Career
This song was originally meant for Asha Bhonsle who since was busy those days. Therefore, Annu Malik recorded this song in the voice of Anupama Deshpande so that it could later on be dubbed by Asha Bhonsle. But on listening the song, Asha Bhonsle sportingly advised to retain the song as it was, in the voice of Anupama Deshpande by giving full credit to the Anupama's singing talent. She has sung a total of 124 songs in 92 films.

Notable songs
"दे तुलसी मैया वरदान इतना
मैंने जिसे चाहा वही मिला सजना from Ghar Ghar ki kahani 1988
"Pollaadha Madhana Baanam" from Hey Ram! (Tamil) with Ilaiyaraja
"Sohni Chinab Di" from Sohni Mahiwal
"Mee Aaj Nahatana" from Nirmala Machindra Kamble
"Bhiyu Nako" Nirmala Machindra Kamble
"Gabhru Nako" Nirmala Machindra Kamble
"Mera Peshha Kharab Hai" from Bhediyon Ka Samooh
"Parvat Se Jhan" from Bhediyon Ka Samooh
"Humko Aaj Kal Hai" from Sailaab
"Tum Mere Ho" from Tum Mere Ho
"Main Teri Rani (short version)" from Lootere
"O Yaara Tu Hai Pyaarose bhi Pyaara" from Kassh
"Bicchua" from Arth
"Aankh mein Noor hai" from Yaa Ali Madad (Ismaili Geets)
"Tumse Mile Bin" from Kabja 
"Teri jawani badi mast mast hai" from Pyar kiya toh darna kya
"Soponer Mollika Aaj Tomai Dilam" from Tumi Kato Sundor with Amit Kumar(Bengali)

References

External links

Living people
Bollywood playback singers
Indian women folk singers
Indian folk singers
Indian women playback singers
20th-century Indian singers
20th-century Indian women singers
1953 births
Singers from Mumbai
Women musicians from Maharashtra
Filmfare Awards winners